Yana Alekseyevna Churikova (born 6 November 1978) is a Russian journalist and television host who worked on MTV Russia before moving to Channel One, where she hosted seven seasons of the Star Factory talent show. 

She has also gained publicity across Europe and the world for presenting the results of the Russian televote at the Eurovision Song Contest for several years. Churikova was to host the Eurovision Song Contest 2009, to be held in Moscow, Russia. However, her pregnancy was announced shortly afterwards and she instead hosted only the allocation draw to determine the participating countries' semi-finals. Her daughter Taisa Lazareva was born on 26 May 2009, 10 days after the Eurovision final.

Every other year, from 2009 to 2021, Churikova provided commentary to Eurovision Song Contest on Channel One. She also hosted the national final to select Russia's entry for Eurovision Song Contest 2021.

External links

 
  Official site of Yana Churikova
  Яна Чурикова in Peoples.ru database
  Yana Churikova in LiveJournal

1978 births
Living people
VJs (media personalities)
Russian television personalities
Mass media people from Moscow
Moscow State University alumni
Russian women journalists
MTV executives